Jenifer H. Moore is a career member of the U.S. Foreign Service serving as Chargé d'Affaires en pied at the U.S. Embassy in Minsk, Belarus since August 2018.

Moore is the acting ambassador to Belarus, as one can not be appointed due to tensions between the two nations. Moore's term as ambassador ended in July 2020.

Education
Moore graduated from the Georgia Institute of Technology with a Bachelor and Master of Science degrees in International Affairs and a Master of Science degree in Public Policy.

References

Living people
Ambassadors of the United States to Belarus
Georgia Tech alumni
American women ambassadors
Year of birth missing (living people)
21st-century American diplomats
21st-century American women